Andipatti is a constituency in the Tamil Nadu legislative assembly, that includes the city, Andipatti. It is a part of the Theni Lok Sabha constituency. It is one of the 234 State Legislative Assembly Constituencies in Tamil Nadu, in India.

Madras State

Tamil Nadu

Election results

2021

Bye-election 2019

2016

2011

2006

V.S. Chandran belonged to DMDK, led by actor turned politician Vijaykanth.

Bye-election 2002

2001

1996

1991

1989

1984

1980

1977

1971

1967

1962

References 

 

Assembly constituencies of Tamil Nadu